Eskdale (IPA:[ˈeʃkʲət̪əɫ̪]) is a glen and former lordship in the county of Dumfriesshire, Scotland. The River Esk flows through Eskdale to its estuary at the Solway Firth.

In 1620, when 13 continuous days of snow occurred in Scotland, on Eskdale Moor only 35 of a flock of 20,000 sheep survived.

Sources

Glens of Scotland
Landforms of Dumfries and Galloway
Annandale and Eskdale